WGRM may refer to:

 WGRM (AM), a defunct radio station (1240 AM) licensed to Greenwood, Mississippi, United States
 WGRM-FM, a defunct radio station (93.9 FM) licensed to Greenwood, Mississippi, United States